Thakur Baldev singh parmar' (27 Jan 1999 – 25 August 2018) was a member of Lok Sabha from Jammu and a leader of Jan Sangh. He was elected to the 6th Lok Sabha. He went to jail in 1949 and 1952 for merger of Jammu and Kashmir with India and for abrogation of article 370 of the Constitution. He was also a member of the Jammu and Kashmir Legislative Assembly.

References

1919 births
2008 deaths
Lok Sabha members from Jammu and Kashmir
Bharatiya Jana Sangh politicians
India MPs 1977–1979
People from Jammu
University of the Punjab alumni
Politicians from Jammu
Jammu and Kashmir MLAs 1977–1983
Jammu and Kashmir MLAs 1987–1996